Jose Maria Canlas Sison (February 8, 1939 – December 16, 2022), also known by his nickname Joma, was a Filipino writer and activist who founded the Communist Party of the Philippines (CPP) and added elements of Maoism to its philosophy – which would be known as national democracy. He applied the theory of Marxism–Leninism–Maoism to the history and current circumstances of the Philippines.

From August 2002, he was classified as a "person supporting terrorism" by the United States. The European Union's second highest court ruled in September 2009 to delist him as a "person supporting terrorism" and reversed a decision by member governments to freeze his assets. Sison would later live in the Netherlands, applying for asylum as a political refugee in 1988, a contested request which was eventually approved in 1995.

The CPP, along with its affiliates New People's Army and the National Democratic Front, are also considered terrorist organizations by the Philippines' Anti-Terrorism Council.

Early years

Jose Maria Canlas Sison was born on February 8, 1939, in Cabugao, Ilocos Sur to a prominent landowning family with ancestry from Spanish-Mexican-Malay mestizos and from Fujian, China and with connections to other prominent clans such as the Crisólogos, Geraldinos, Vergaras, Azcuetas, Sollers, Serranos and Singsons. His great-grandfather Don Leandro Serrano was the biggest landlord in northern Luzon at the end of the 19th century. His grandfather Don Gorgonio Soller Sison was the last gobernadorcillo of Cabugao under Spanish colonial rule, the municipal president under the Philippine revolutionary government and first mayor under US colonial rule. His great-uncle Don Marcelino Crisólogo was the first governor of Ilocos Sur. His uncle Teófilo Sison was a governor of Pangasinan and the first Defense Secretary in the Commonwealth government. He was convicted in 1946 of having collaborated with the Japanese occupation forces but was amnestied in 1947. During his childhood in Ilocos, he learned about the Huk rebellion in Central Luzon from Ilocano farm workers and from his mother who belonged to a landlord family in Mexico, Pampanga. In his early high school years in Manila, he talked to his barber about Hukbalahap activities. Unlike his elder siblings, he attended a public school before entering Ateneo de Manila University and later studying at Colegio de San Juan de Letran.

Sison graduated from the University of the Philippines in 1959 with the degree of Bachelor of Arts in English literature with honors and then studied Indonesian in Indonesia before returning to the Philippines and becoming a university professor of literature and eventually Rizal Studies and Political Science. He joined the Lavaite Partido Komunista ng Pilipinas in December 1962 and became a member of its executive committee in early 1963. He was the Vice Chairman of the Lapiang Manggagawa (which eventually became the Socialist Party) and the general secretary of the Movement for the Advancement of Nationalism. In 1964, he co-founded the Kabataang Makabayan, or Patriotic Youth, with Nilo S. Tayag. This organization organized youth against the Vietnam War, Ferdinand Marcos, imperialism, bureaucrat capitalism and feudalism. The organization also spearheaded the study of Maoism as part of 'the struggle'.

Political career
On December 26, 1968, he formed and led the Central Committee of the Communist Party of the Philippines (CPP), an organization founded on Marxism–Leninism–Mao Zedong Thought, stemming from his experience as a youth leader and labor and land reform activist. This was known as the First Great Rectification Movement where Sison and other radical youth criticized the existing party leadership for its errors and failures since 1942. The old Communist Party had been run under a series of Moscow-leaning general secretaries from the Lava family. The reestablished CPP set its general political line as two-stage revolution comprising national-democratic as the first stage then proceeding to the socialist revolution. During this period, Sison went by the nom de guerre of Amado Guerrero, meaning "beloved warrior", under which he published the book manifesto Philippine Society and Revolution.

After this, the old Communist Party sought to eliminate and marginalize Sison. However, the reorganized CPP had a larger base and renewed political line that attracted thousands to join its ranks. 
On March 29, 1969, the CPP, along with an HMB (Huk) faction led by Bernabe Buscayno, organized the New People's Army (NPA), the guerrilla-military wing of the party, whose guerrilla fronts, numbering more than 110, are nationwide and cover substantial portions of 75 of the 81 Philippine provinces. The NPA seeks to wage a peasant-worker revolutionary war in the countryside against landlords and foreign companies by operating in rural communities and mountains as strategy for protection.

Sison was arrested in November 1977 in La Union during the Marcos presidency and was imprisoned for almost 9 years, most of which was spent in solitary confinement. Sison wrote prolifically while incarcerated, including his Basic Principles of Marxism-Leninism: a Primer, which his wife Julie de Lima smuggled out of prison in 1982.

Sison was released from military detention on March 5, 1986, after the overthrow of Marcos. His experience is described in Prison & Beyond, a book of poetry released in 1986, which won the Southeast Asia WRITE award for the Philippines. Two biographies have been written about him: one by the German writer Dr. Rainer Werning: The Philippine Revolution: From the Leader's View Point (1989), and one by the Filipina novelist Ninotchka Rosca, At Home in the World (2004). Two major biopics of Sison as founder of Kabataang Makabayan (titled Tibak) and the Communist Party of the Philippines (titled The Guerrilla Is a Poet) have been produced by major film makers in the Philippines.

The CPP has stated for over 20 years that Sison is no longer involved in operational decisions and served from Europe in an advisory role as chief political consultant of the National Democratic Front in peace negotiations with the Manila government. In 1986, after he was freed from prison, Sison embarked on a world tour. In October, he accepted the Southeast Asia WRITE Award for a book of his poems from the Crown Prince of Thailand in October 1986 in Bangkok. While visiting the Netherlands in September 1988, he was informed that his passport had been revoked and that charges had been filed against him under the Anti-Subversion Law of the Philippines. Those charges were later dropped, as were subsequent charges filed by authorities in the Philippines.

In 1989, Sison was cited in journalist Gregg Jones' book Red Revolution as having coordinated the Plaza Miranda bombing in August 1971 based on interviews with members of the CPP and the NPA.

2007 arrest
The International Crime Investigation Team of the Dutch National Criminal Investigation Department arrested Jose Maria Sison in Utrecht on August 28, 2007. Sison was arrested for his alleged involvement from the Netherlands in three assassinations that took place in the Philippines: the murder of Romulo Kintanar in 2003, and the murders of Arturo Tabara and Stephen Ong in 2006. On the day of his arrest, Sison's apartment and eight apartments of his co-workers were searched by the Dutch National Criminal Investigation Department.

Some 100 left-wing activists held a demonstration for the release of Sison, marching towards the Dutch embassy in Manila on August 30, 2007. The demonstration was swiftly ended by police.

There were no plans to hold the trial in the Philippines since there was no extradition request and the crimes Sison was accused of were committed in the Netherlands. Dutch lawyer Victor Koppe said that Sison would enter a plea of not guilty during his indictment. He could have received the maximum penalty of life imprisonment.

On September 1, 2007, National Democratic Front peace panel chair Luis Jalandoni confirmed that the Dutch government was "maltreating" Sison because the court detained him in solitary confinement for several weeks without access to media, newspapers, television, radio or visitors; it also denied him the right to bring prescription medicines to his cell. The place where Sison was held was the same one used by the late former Yugoslav president Slobodan Milosevic who was held for war crimes and corruption. Meanwhile, protests were held in Indonesia, Hong Kong, Australia, the United States and Canada. The Communist Party of the Philippines (CPP) feared that Sison may be "extra-judicially" transferred to the United States. CPP spokesman Gregorio Rosal said that the U.S. may detain and subject Sison to extraordinary rendition in Guantanamo Bay or some secret facility. U.S. ambassador Kristie Ann Kenney formally announced that the U.S. will extend support to the Dutch government to prosecute Sison.

In New York City, former United States Attorney General and left-wing human rights lawyer Ramsey Clark called for Sison's release and pledged assistance by joining the latter's legal defense team headed by Belgian lawyer Jan Fermon. Clark doubted Dutch authorities' validity and competency, since the murder charges originated in the Philippines and had already been dismissed by the country's Supreme Court.

Committee DEFEND, an International group stated that the Dutch government tortured Sison at the National Penitentiary in Scheveningen (used by the Nazis in World War II to torture Dutch resistance fighters). His wife, Julie De Lima failed to see him to give medicines and warm clothes on August 30, 2007. Meanwhile, Sison's counsel, Romeo Capulong, questioned the Dutch government's jurisdiction over the issue and person alleging that the Supreme Court of the Philippines already dismissed the subject cases on July 2.

On September 7, 2007, the Dutch court heard defense arguments for Sison, and stated that it would issue the resolution next week on whether to extend the detention. Supporters outside The Hague District Court chanted slogans while the wife, Julie De Lima stated that they complained to the International Committee of the Red Cross. Luis Jalandoni, chairman of the National Democratic Front, accused the government of Prime Minister Jan Peter Balkenende of being "a workhorse" for Philippines President Gloria Macapagal Arroyo and for the U.S. government.

The National Lawyers Guild (NLG), a progressive bar association in New York then headed by Marjorie Cohn, denounced the arrest of Sison, saying "it exposes the hand of the Arroyo administration in yet another assault on the rights of the people to dissent and organize". Sison will remain in jail until Thursday, but was provided TV, radio and medication.

On September 12, 2007, lawyers Edre Olalia and Rachel Pastores stated that Sison's lawyers will appeal the reported Dutch court's newly promulgated ruling extending Sison's detention for 90 days. The Dutch court did not extend the detention for 90 days but released him on September 13, 2007, after being in solitary confinement for 17 days.

Release from detention
Dutch public prosecutor's office's Wim de Bruin stated that Sison was released from jail at 10:45 a.m. on September 13, 2007. The court ruled that there was insufficient evidence to detain him on murder charges, specifically, if Sison "had a conscious and close cooperation with those in the Philippines who carried out the deed".

On September 27, 2007, Sison appeared before The Hague Court of Appeal panel of 3 judges on the public prosecutor's appeal against the district court's September 13 judgment of release.

On September 28, 2007, the Dutch Ambassador to the Philippines, Robert Brinks, announced that 3 Dutch judicial officials and Dutch prosecution lawyer Wim De Bruin will visit the Philippines "later this year" to review the evidence against Jose Maria Sison. The next day Leung Kwok Hung, a Hong Kong politician and member of the April Fifth Action vowed to support Sison. Leung was in Europe at the Inter-Parliamentary Union assembly in Geneva, Switzerland. He sits in the Hong Kong legislature as a member of the Finance and House Committees, and of the Legislative Panels on Constitutional Affairs, Housing, Manpower, Transport, and on Welfare Services.

On October 3, 2007, the Dutch court dismissed the prosecution's appeal against the release Sison, confirming his freedom while the Dutch police continue to investigate: "the prosecution file lacks enough concrete clues that Sison can be directly linked to the assassinations which is needed to prosecute him as a perpetrator". However, the decision does not bar prosecution for murder. But the Dutch Public Prosecutor's Office (per spokesman Wim de Bruin) stated that it did not drop the charges against Sison yet, who remains a suspect. De Bruin said: "No, you have to separate the criminal investigation by the police from the investigation by the examining judge in The Hague. So the judge decided to finish the investigation but the police investigation will be continued and that means that Mr. Sison is still a suspect."

The Dutch court, on May 20, 2008, heard Sison's appeal against the Dutch Public Prosecutors Office's request to extend its investigation until December, since the investigators arrived in the Philippines in February and interviewed witnesses. At the trial, however, the new evidence showed that there were indeed attempts to kill him, in 1999 and 2000, while Kintanar's wife, Joy, directly accused Edwin Garcia in the murder of her husband. The Dutch court scheduled the promulgation on the verdict on June 10, 2008.

The Dutch District Court of The Hague on June 5, 2008, decided in camera "that the Public Prosecution Service may continue the prosecution of Jose Maria Sison for involvement in, among other matters, a number of murders committed in the Philippines in 2003 and 2004; that while the prosecution's case file still held insufficient evidence, the investigation was ongoing and should be given time to unfold". In February 2010, the Dutch Public Prosecution Service finally terminated its investigation of Sison and dropped the criminal charges against him.

Personal life
Sison met his wife, Julie de Lima, when both were students at UP Diliman. Attending the same study groups, they grew closer and married first in a civil wedding in September 1959 and then in a Catholic church wedding in January 1960. The couple has four children.

His wife belongs to the prominent De Lima family of Iriga City, Camarines Sur and is the aunt of Senator Leila de Lima, who served as Chair of the Commission on Human Rights during the Presidency of Gloria Macapagal-Arroyo, Secretary of the Philippine Department of Justice under the administration of President Benigno S. Aquino III., and Senator during the administration of President Rodrigo Duterte.

Sison returned to teach at the University of the Philippines soon after his release from prison in 1986. He then went on a global lecture tour, starting in September 1986. He applied for political asylum in the Netherlands in 1988 after his Philippine passport was cancelled by the Philippine government. He had been earlier released from prison by the government of Corazon Aquino for the sake of "national reconciliation" and for his role in opposing Marcos. The release of Sison was vehemently protested by the military. It is reported that upon his release, Sison and his followers actively sought to discredit the Aquino government in the European media by speaking out on Aquino's human rights violations, including the Mendiola massacre, in which members of the military were accused of firing on unarmed peasants in Manila, killing 17 people.

He was the chairperson of the International League of Peoples' Struggle, and the Chief Political Consultant of the National Democratic Front of the Philippines. Since 1987, Sison had based himself in the Netherlands for his European lecture tour. Since 1992, he has stayed in the Netherlands as a recognized political refugee.

Later life and death
In 2017, President Rodrigo Duterte, claimed that Sison had colon cancer. Sison, while admitting he has been hospitalized at the Utrecht University Medical Center in March of that year connection to his rheumatoid arthritis and Sweet syndrome symptoms, said that he has no serious illness including cancer. In early 2022, reports emerged that Sison had died; Sison himself refuted his supposed death. Later that year, on December 16, the Communist Party of the Philippines, alongside its news organ Ang Bayan, announced the death of Sison after having been confined in a hospital in Utrecht, Netherlands, for two weeks. NDFP executive Luis Jalandoni disclosed that Sison died due to heart failure, after almost three weeks of hospital treatment, although he did not provide more details about Sison's death.

Controversies
Former Senator Jovito Salonga accused Sison of orchestrating the 1971 Plaza Miranda bombing during the Liberal Party convention to force Marcos to suspend the writ of habeas corpus and sign Proclamation No. 1081, initiating the advent of Martial Law in the Philippines. This accusation comes from former CPP members such as Victor Corpuz and others. The Philippine National Police (PNP) filed a criminal case against Sison for the Plaza Miranda bombing, but the charges were dismissed for lack of evidence, with the dismissal order citing the complainant's filing criminal charges based on speculation.

On July 4, 2008, Manila's RTC Executive Judge Reynaldo Ros assumed jurisdiction over the 1,551-page cases of multiple murder lawsuits against Sison, Bayan Muna Representative Satur Ocampo, and National Democratic Front member Luis Jalandoni after the Supreme Court's Third Division ordered a change of venue from the Hilongos, Leyte RTC Branch 18 for safety reasons. During the time when these alleged killings supposedly took place, Sison and Ocampo had long been under maximum detention of the Marcos regime. Sison, Ocampo, and other political detainees were only freed in 1986 after the first EDSA uprising of the same year.

The European Union's second highest court ruled to delist Sison and the Stichting Al-Aqsa group from the EU terror list since the 27-nation bloc failed to respect their rights when blacklisted. The Luxembourg-based Court of Justice further reversed a decision by member governments to freeze the assets of Sison and the Netherlands-based Al-Aqsa Foundation, since the EU governments failed to inform them why the assets were frozen. Dekker said that EU lawyers in Brussels can lodge any appeal. The EU was also ordered to shoulder all the litigation expenses during the five-year appeal of Sison against the Dutch government and the EU. The final judgment of the European Court of Justice to remove Sison from the EU terrorist blacklist on September 30, 2009, became final and binding on December 10, 2009, inasmuch as the EU did not make appeal. The court's decisions and other documents pertaining to cases involving Sison in the Philippines are compiled under the section of Legal Cases in www.josemariasison.org and can be further verified in the archives of the pertinent courts.

Works

Selected writings 1968–1991
2013. 1968-1972 Foundation for Resuming the Philippine Revolution. International Network for Philippine Studies and Aklat ng Bayan, Inc. 
2013. 1969-1974 Defeating Revisionism, Reformism & Opportunism. International Network for Philippine Studies and Aklat ng Bayan, Inc.
2013. 1972-1977 Building Strength through Struggle. International Network for Philippine Studies and Aklat ng Bayan, Inc.
2013. 1977-1986 Detention and Defiance against Dictatorship. International Network for Philippine Studies and Aklat ng Bayan, Inc.
2015. 1986-1991 Continuing the Struggle for National & Social Liberation. International Network for Philippine Studies and Aklat ng Bayan, Inc.

Selected writings 1991–2009
2009. 1991-1994 For Justice, Socialism and Peace. Aklat ng Bayan, Inc.
2009. 1995-2001 For Democracy and Socialism Against Imperialist Globalization. Aklat ng Bayan, Inc.
2009. 2001-2006 Crisis of Imperialism and People's Resistance. Aklat ng Bayan, Inc.
2009. 2006-2009 People's Struggle Against Imperialist Plunder and Terror. Aklat ng Bayan, Inc.

Peoples' struggles against oppression and exploitation: selected writings 2009–2015
2015. 2009-2010 Crisis Generates Resistance. International Network for Philippine Studies
2016. 2010-2011 Building People's Power. International Network for Philippine Studies
2017. 2012 Combat Neoliberal Globalization. International Network for Philippine Studies
2018. 2013 Struggle against Imperialist Plunder and Wars. International Network for Philippine Studies
2018. 2014-2015 Strengthen the People's Struggle against Imperialism and Reaction. International Network for Philippine Studies

Selected writings 2016–2021
2018. 2016 People's Resistance to Greed and Terror. International Network for Philippine Studies
2019. 2017 Combat Tyranny and Fascism. International Network for Philippine Studies
2019. January–July 2018 Struggle against Terrorism and Tyranny Volume I. International Network for Philippine Studies
2019. August–December 2018 Struggle against Terrorism and Tyranny Volume II. International Network for Philippine Studies
2021. 2019 Resist Neoliberalism, Fascism, and Wars of Aggression. International Network for Philippine Studies

Other works
2020. Basic Principles of Marxism–Leninism: A Primer. Reprint. Paris, Foreign Languages Press
2019. Reflections on Revolution and Prospects. International Network for Philippine Studies
2017. Specific Characteristics of our People's War. Reprint. Paris, Foreign Languages Press
2003. US Terrorism and War in the Philippines. Netherlands, Papieren Tijger
1998. Philippine Economy and Politics. Co-authored by Julieta de Lima. Philippines, Aklat ng Bayan, Inc.
1989. The Philippine Revolution : The Leader's View. With Rainer Werning. New York : Crane Russak.
1984. Prison and Beyond: Selected Poems, 1958–1983. Quezon City: Free Jose Maria Sison Committee.
1971. Philippine Society and Revolution. As Amado Guerrero. Manila: Pulang Tala.
1967. Struggle for National Democracy. Quezon City, Progressive Publications

References

Further reading

External links
Josemariasison.org
The Arrest of Joma Sison (dossier of the Philippine Daily Inquirer)

1939 births
2022 deaths
20th-century Filipino poets
Anti-Americanism
Anti-fascists
Anti-imperialism
Anti-revisionists
Ateneo de Manila University alumni
Colegio de San Juan de Letran alumni
Communist Party of the Philippines politicians
Communist poets
Filipino communists
Filipino exiles
Filipino expatriates in the Netherlands
Filipino people of Kapampangan descent
Filipino political party founders
Filipino revolutionaries
Filipino writers
Ilocano people
Ilocano-language writers
Individuals designated as terrorists by the United States government
Maoist theorists
People convicted on terrorism charges
People from Ilocos Sur
S.E.A. Write Award winners
University of the Philippines alumni